Ablakatov (masculine) or Ablakatova (feminine) is a Russian last name, a variant of which is Oblakatov (masculine) or Oblakatova (feminine).

It derives from a patronymic which itself is derived from the occupational nickname "" (ablakat) or "" (oblakat). The nickname is a corruption of the word "" (advokat), meaning defense lawyer.

People with the last name
Alexandra Ablakatova, Russian mycologist

References

Notes

Sources
И. М. Ганжина (I. M. Ganzhina). "Словарь современных русских фамилий" (Dictionary of Modern Russian Last Names). Москва, 2001. 

Russian-language surnames
